November 21 - Eastern Orthodox liturgical calendar - November 23

All fixed commemorations below are observed on December 5 by Eastern Orthodox Churches on the Old Calendar.

For November 22, Orthodox Churches on the Old Calendar commemorate the Saints listed on November 9.

Feasts

 Afterfeast of the Entry of the Most Holy Theotokos into the Temple.

Saints

 Apostles of the 70 Philemon and Archippus, Martyr Apphia (wife of Philemon and Equal to the Apostles), and St. Onesimus, disciple of Saint Paul (c. 109)
 Martyrs Cecilia, Valerian, Tiburtius, and Maximus at Rome (c. 230 or 288)
 Martyr Menignus at Parium, the Tanner, by beheading (250)
 Martyrs Stephen, Mark, and Mark at Antioch in Pisidia, by beheading (290)
 Martyr Procopius the Reader at Caesarea in Palestine, by the sword (303)
 Martyr Agapion of Greece (Agapionos the Roman) (304)
 Martyr Agapios of Cappadocia, by the sword.
 Martyr Thaddeus. 
 Martyrs Christopher and Euphemia, by the sword.
 Martyrs Thalalaeus and Anthimus, by the sword.  (see also: November 19)
 Hieromartyr Sisinius, by the sword.  (see also: November 23)
 Venerable Agabbas (Abbas) of Syria (5th century)
 Righteous Michael the Soldier of Potuka, Bulgaria (866)
 Venerable Germanus, founder of the Monastery of the Theotokos Eikosiphinissa, in the Metropolis of Drama, Greece (9th century)
 Saint Clement of Ochrid, Bishop of Ohrid (Achrida), Enlightener of Bulgaria and Wonderworker (916)  (see also: July 27)

Pre-Schism Western saints

 Martyr Maurus, born of Christian parents in North Africa, he was martyred in Rome under Numerian.
 Saint Pragmatius, Bishop of Autun in France (c. 520)
 Saint Deyniolen (Deiniol the Younger), Abbot of Bangor Abbey in Wales (621) 
 Saint Sabinian, Third Abbot of Moutier-Saint-Chaffre in France (c. 720)
 Saint Christian, thirty-seventh Bishop of Auxerre in France (c. 873)
 Saint Tigridia (Trigidia), Abbess of San Salvador de Oña, which her father Count Sancho Garcia founded for her to direct (c. 925)

Post-Schism Orthodox saints

 Blessed Yaropolk-Peter, Prince of Vladimir in Volhynia (1086)
 Martyrdom of St. Michael of Tver, Prince of Tver (1318)
 Venerable Callistus II Xanothopoulos, Hesychast monk of Mount Athos and Patriarch of Constantinople (1397)
 Venerable Iakovos (Tsalikis) of Euboea the New Ascetic, Igumen of the Monastery of Saint David the Elder in Euboea (1991)

New martyrs and confessors

 New Hieromartyr Vladimir Ryasensky of Tver, Priest (1932)
 New Hieromartyr Joasaph (Zhevakhov), Bishop of Mogilev (1937) 
 New Hieromartyr Gerasimus (Mochalov), Hieromonk of the Zosima Hermitage, Smolensk (1937)
 New Monk-martyrs Eutychius (Didenko), Abner (Sinitsyn), Sava (Suslov), and Mark (Makhrov), of Optina Monastery, and with them Martyr Boris Kozlov (1937)
 New Hieromartyrs Elias Gromoglasov, and Alexis Benemansky, Protopresbyters of Ryazan, and Athanasius Milov, Priest of Chimkent (1937) 
 New Hieromartyrs John Smirnov, Basil Bov, Paul Evdokimov, Jacob Sokolov, Theodore Gusiev, John Baranov, Priests (1937)
 Venerable Paraskeva (Matieshina), Confessor (1953)

Icon gallery

Notes

References

Sources
 November 22 / December 5. Orthodox Calendar (PRAVOSLAVIE.RU).
 December 5 / November 22. Holy Trinity Russian Orthodox Church (A parish of the Patriarchate of Moscow).
 November 22. OCA - The Lives of the Saints.
 The Autonomous Orthodox Metropolia of Western Europe and the Americas (ROCOR). St. Hilarion Calendar of Saints for the year of our Lord 2004. St. Hilarion Press (Austin, TX). p. 87.
 The Twenty-Second Day of the Month of November. Orthodoxy in China.
 November 22. Latin Saints of the Orthodox Patriarchate of Rome.
 The Roman Martyrology. Transl. by the Archbishop of Baltimore. Last Edition, According to the Copy Printed at Rome in 1914. Revised Edition, with the Imprimatur of His Eminence Cardinal Gibbons. Baltimore: John Murphy Company, 1916. p. 360-361.
 Rev. Richard Stanton. A Menology of England and Wales, or, Brief Memorials of the Ancient British and English Saints Arranged According to the Calendar, Together with the Martyrs of the 16th and 17th Centuries. London: Burns & Oates, 1892. p. 562.
Greek Sources
 Great Synaxaristes:  22 ΝΟΕΜΒΡΙΟΥ. ΜΕΓΑΣ ΣΥΝΑΞΑΡΙΣΤΗΣ.
  Συναξαριστής. 22 Νοεμβρίου. ECCLESIA.GR. (H ΕΚΚΛΗΣΙΑ ΤΗΣ ΕΛΛΑΔΟΣ). 
  22/11/2015. Ορθόδοξος Συναξαριστής. 
Russian Sources
  5 декабря (22 ноября). Православная Энциклопедия под редакцией Патриарха Московского и всея Руси Кирилла (электронная версия). (Orthodox Encyclopedia - Pravenc.ru).
  22 ноября по старому стилю / 5 декабря по новому стилю. Русская Православная Церковь - Православный церковный календарь на 2018 год.

November in the Eastern Orthodox calendar